Jean-Christophe Sarnin (born April 2, 1976 in Lyon, Rhône) is a retired male breaststroke swimmer from France, who represented his native country at the 1996 Summer Olympics in Atlanta, United States. He won the silver medal in the men's 200m breaststroke at the 1998 World Aquatics Championships in Perth, Australia.

References
sports-reference

1976 births
Living people
French male breaststroke swimmers
Olympic swimmers of France
Swimmers at the 1996 Summer Olympics
Sportspeople from Lyon
World Aquatics Championships medalists in swimming